Duck Lake is a lake in Glacier County, Montana located   east of the community of Babb, Montana.

See also
List of lakes in Flathead County, Montana (A-L)

References

Lakes of Montana
Lakes of Glacier County, Montana